Ján Novák (born 6 March 1985) is a Slovak footballer who plays for Mladosť Kalša as a forward.

Club career
Novák became the 2007–08 Corgoň Liga top goalscorer, scoring 17 goals in 23 matches. In 2 consecutive games he scored 8 times. He scored three times against A.S. Roma in the 2009–10 UEFA Europa League play-off round whereby he showed great performance, evoking interest in Fulham. Novák had a trial at Birmingham City in December 2009 for 5 days with a view to completing a £2m move. However Birmingham City manager decided against signing Novák stating that he wanted to sign players that he knew in fear of wasting the club's transfer budget. He was injured at pre-season training camp in July 2010. He had to undergo surgery of the cruciate ligament and meniscus in August 2010. Nevertheless, he signed a half-year loan for the Ligue 2 team Tours in December 2010. His convalescence was not successful and he did not play any match for Tours. He played his first match after injury against Spartak Trnava on 24 July 2011. In the first half of the 2011–12 season his form was behind his performances before the injury. In January 2012, he signed a two-year contract for Žilina.

International career
On 20 May 2008, Novák made his debut for the Slovak national team in a 0–1 defeat against Turkey in a friendly match.

Career statistics

Honours

MFK Košice
 Slovak Cup: 2008–09

Individual
 Corgoň Liga Top Scorer: 2007–08

References

External links
 MFK Košice profile 
 
 

1985 births
Living people
Sportspeople from Trebišov
Association football forwards
Slovak footballers
Slovakia international footballers
FK Slavoj Trebišov players
FC VSS Košice players
Tours FC players
MŠK Žilina players
FK Iskra Borčice players
1. FC Tatran Prešov players
TJ Mladosť Kalša players
Slovak Super Liga players
2. Liga (Slovakia) players
3. Liga (Slovakia) players
Ligue 2 players
Slovak expatriate footballers
Expatriate footballers in France